Philip Roller (born 10 June 1994) is a professional footballer who plays as a right-back or a right winger for Thai League 1 club Port. Born in Germany, he represents the Thailand national team.

Club career
Roller began playing football with local side TSV Bad Boll. He played in the youth system of 1.FC Eislingen, VfL Kirchheim, SSV Ulm 1846, Grasshopper Club Zürich and Stuttgarter Kickers but never joined their senior sides. Roller would play in the Oberliga and Regionalliga before signing with SC Austria Lustenau where he made 13 Austrian Football First League appearances.

Ratchaburi Mitr Phol
In 2017, Roller moved to Thailand, joining Ratchaburi Mitr Phol a few weeks before making his international debut.

International career
Roller is eligible to play international football for the Thailand national team through his Thai mother.

In 2017 he was in the squad of Thailand for 2017 King's Cup

In 2021, he was called up by Alexandré Pölking to play for Thailand at the 2020 AFF Championship.

Career statistics

Scores and results list Thailand's goal tally first, score column indicates score after each Roller goal.

Honours
Thailand
 AFF Championship: 2020
 King's Cup: 2017

Individual
 Thai League 1 Player of the Month: March 2021
 Thai League 1 Best XI: 2020–21

References

External links
Philip Roller at Soccerway

1994 births
Living people
Footballers from Munich
Philip Roller
Philip Roller
German footballers
German people of Thai descent
FV Illertissen players
SVN Zweibrücken players
SC Pfullendorf players
2. Liga (Austria) players
SC Austria Lustenau players
Philip Roller
Philip Roller
Association football fullbacks
Thai expatriate sportspeople in Austria
Thai expatriate sportspeople in Switzerland
Philip Roller